Couperin Bay is a bay on the south coast of Beethoven Peninsula, Alexander Island, between Perce Point and Berlioz Point. The bay was photographed from the air by the Ronne Antarctic Research Expedition, 1947–48, and was mapped from the photographs by D. Searle of Falkland Islands Dependencies Survey in 1960. It was named by the UK Antarctic Place-Names Committee in 1977 in association with the names of composers grouped in this area, after François Couperin, the French composer. Couperin Bay marks the westernmost bay of Alexander Island.

Further reading 
  Jane G. Ferrigno, Alison J. Cook, Amy M. Mathie, Richard S. Williams, Jr., Charles Swithinbank, Kevin M. Foley, Adrian J. Fox, Janet W. Thomson, and Jörn Sievers,  Coastal-Change and Glaciological Map of the Palmer Land Area, Antarctica: 1947–2009 , U.S. Geological Survey Geologic Investigations Series Map I–2600–C, 1 map sheet, 28-p

External links 

 Couperin Bay on USGS website
 Couperin Bay on AADC website
 Couperin Bay on SCAR website
 Couperin Bay on marineregions.org

References 
 

Bays of Antarctica
Bodies of water of Alexander Island